2014 Emperor's Cup Final was the 94th final of the Emperor's Cup competition. The final was played at International Stadium Yokohama in Kanagawa on December 13, 2014. Gamba Osaka won the championship.

Match details

See also
2014 Emperor's Cup

References

Emperor's Cup
2014 in Japanese football
Gamba Osaka matches
Montedio Yamagata matches